Foxhole in Cairo is a 1960 British war film directed by John Llewellyn Moxey and based on a novel by Leonard Mosley itself based upon the real-life Operation Salaam. It starred James Robertson Justice, Adrian Hoven, Fenella Fielding and Henry Oscar. Future star Michael Caine makes a brief appearance as a German soldier, in one of his earlier screen roles.

Synopsis
During the Second World War Field Marshal Erwin Rommel has placed two spies in Cairo, at the headquarters of the British Eighth Army. They are able to monitor every move of the British. It falls to British intelligence to hunt down the spies before they do too much damage to the war effort.

Cast
 James Robertson Justice as Captain Robertson
 Adrian Hoven as John Eppler
 Niall MacGinnis as Radek
 Peter van Eyck as Count Almassy
 Robert Urquhart as Major Wilson
 Neil McCallum as Sandy
 Fenella Fielding as Yvette
 Gloria Mestre as Amina
 Albert Lieven as Erwin Rommel
 John Westbrook as Roger
 Lee Montague as Aberle
 Michael Caine as Weber
 Henry Oscar as Col. Zeltinger
 Howard Marion-Crawford as British Major
 Anthony Newlands as S.S. Colonel
 Richard Vernon as British General
 Nancy Nevinson as Signorina Signorelli
 Jerome Willis as 1st British Signals Sergeant
 Philip Bond as German signals sergeant
 Walter Randall as 2nd Barman

Reception
Kine Weekly called it a "money maker" at the British box office in 1960. 

A 1961 New York Times review described the film as "a routine British-made espionage yarn" calling the plot "slack and predictable", while praising the professional performance of James Robertson Justice.

See also
 Rommel Calls Cairo (1959)

References

External links
 

1960 films
1960s English-language films
North African campaign films
World War II spy films
British multilingual films
British remakes of German films
Films directed by John Llewellyn Moxey
Films scored by Douglas Gamley
1960s multilingual films